Lydia Nayeli Rangel Hernández (born 28 February 1992) is a Mexican footballer who plays as a midfielder for Tigres UANL and the Mexico women's national team.

Early life
Rangel was born and raised in Monterrey, Mexico.

Playing career

Club

On 11 January 2013 she joined Sky Blue FC in the new National Women's Soccer League.

In December 2016, she joined Sporting de Huelva of the Spanish first division, Primera División.

In July 2017, she joined her hometown club Tigres UANL of the newly formed Liga MX Femenil.

International

Rangel was part of Mexico's squad at the 2011 FIFA Women's World Cup and captained the team at the 2015 FIFA Women's World Cup, playing three matches in each tournament.

Honours

Club
UANL
Liga MX Femenil: Clausura 2018
Liga MX Femenil: Clausura 2019

Personal life
Rangel is in a relationship.

References

External links
 
 Profile at Mexican Football Federation 
 
 FIFA 2015 Women's World Cup player profile
 
 

1992 births
Living people
Sportspeople from Monterrey
Mexican women's footballers
Footballers from Nuevo León
Women's association football midfielders
National Women's Soccer League players
NJ/NY Gotham FC players
Primera División (women) players
Sporting de Huelva players
Liga MX Femenil players
Tigres UANL (women) footballers
Mexico women's international footballers
2011 FIFA Women's World Cup players
Footballers at the 2011 Pan American Games
Pan American Games bronze medalists for Mexico
Pan American Games medalists in football
2015 FIFA Women's World Cup players
Footballers at the 2015 Pan American Games
Mexican expatriate women's footballers
Mexican expatriate sportspeople in the United States
Expatriate women's soccer players in the United States
Mexican expatriate sportspeople in Spain
Expatriate women's footballers in Spain
Medalists at the 2015 Pan American Games
LGBT association football players
Mexican LGBT sportspeople
Mexican footballers